Otitoma pictolabra is a species of sea snail, a marine gastropod mollusc in the family Pseudomelatomidae, the turrids and allies.

Description
The length of the shell varies between 16 mm and 19 mm.

Distribution
This marine species occurs off Aliguay Island, Philippines

References

 Stahlschmidt P., Poppe G.T. & Tagaro S.P. (2018). Descriptions of remarkable new turrid species from the Philippines. Visaya. 5(1): 5-64 page(s): 27, pl. 21 figs 1-2.

External links
 Gastropods.com: Otitoma pictolabra

pictolabra
Gastropods described in 2018